Face the Music is the fourth album by hard rock and heavy metal supergroup Burning Rain with guitar player Doug Aldrich (Revolution Saints, The Dead Daisies), singer Keith St. John (ex-Montrose) featuring Brad Lang (ex-Y&T) on bass and Blas Elias (ex-Slaughter, Trans-Siberian Orchestra) on drums.

The album was produced by multi-instrumentalist Alessandro Del Vecchio for Italian label Frontiers Records and was released on March 6 in Japan and on March 22, 2019 in the internationally.

On January 10, 2019, "Midnight Train" was released as the first single from the album.

Track listing
All songs written by Keith St. John and Doug Aldrich.

Personnel
 Keith St. John – vocals, producing
 Doug Aldrich – guitar, producing
 Brad Lang – bass guitar, producing
 Blas Elias – drums, producing

Additional personnel
Alessandro Del Vecchio – producing, mixing, mastering
Maor Appelbaum - remastering
Mark@ASYLUMseventy7 - artwork, layout
Gerry Rosenblatt - legal

References

2019 albums
Burning Rain albums
Frontiers Records albums